Sigma Lambda Gamma National Sorority Incorporated is a historically Latinas-based national sorority founded on April 9, 1990, at the University of Iowa in Iowa City, Iowa.

The sorority's chapters are categorized into eleven regions. The regions are as follows:

Central Region: Indiana, Kentucky, Michigan, Ohio, and Tennessee
Mid-Atlantic Region: Delaware, District of Columbia, Maryland, New Jersey, Pennsylvania, Virginia, and West Virginia
Mid-West Region: Illinois and Wisconsin
North Central Region: Iowa, Minnesota, North Dakota, and South Dakota
Northeast Region: Connecticut, Maine, Massachusetts, New Hampshire, New York, Rhode Island, and Vermont
Northwest Region: Idaho, Montana, Oregon, and Washington
Plains Region: Arkansas, Kansas, Missouri, Nebraska, and Oklahoma
Southeast Region: Alabama, Florida, Georgia, Louisiana, Mississippi, North Carolina, and South Carolina
Southern Region: Texas (excluding El Paso)
Southwest Region: Arizona, Colorado, New Mexico, Utah, Wyoming, and El Paso, Texas
Western Region: California and Nevada

Collegiate chapters
Following is a list of Sigma Lambda Gamma collegiate chapters. Active chapters are indicated in bold. Inactive chapters are indicated in italic.

Notes

Alumnae associations

References 

Sigma Lambda Gamma
Sigma Lambda Gamma
chapters